Oliver Axnick (born 17 May 1970 in Füssen) is a German curler.

Axnick has begun to curl at the age of 16. He reached two European Championships, 1992 in Perth and 1997 in Füssen. After his retirement as a curler 2006, he was coach of the German men's curling team until the 2010 Winter Olympics in Vancouver.

Teammates
2006 Turin Olympic Games
Andy Kapp (skip)
Uli Kapp (third)
Holger Höhne (lead)
Andreas Kempf (alternate)

External links
 

German male curlers
1970 births
Living people
Curlers at the 1998 Winter Olympics
Curlers at the 2006 Winter Olympics
Olympic curlers of Germany
European curling champions
Sportspeople from Füssen